Bridge Road may refer to:
Bridge Road (Impington), a football stadium home to Histon F.C.
Bridge Road, Melbourne, a major shopping strip in Melbourne, Australia.

Odonyms referring to a building